Schoeman is a South African surname. Notable people with the surname include:

Adri Schoeman (born 1970), retired South African sprinter, specialized in 400 metres
Anriette Schoeman (born 1977), South African road cyclist
Ben Schoeman (1905–1986), South African politician of the National Party prominent during the apartheid era
Burger Schoeman (born 1988), South African rugby union footballer
Frank Schoeman (born 1975), South African former footballer
Henri Schoeman (born 1991), South African triathlete
Juan Schoeman (born 1991), South African rugby union player
Karel Schoeman (1939–2017), South African novelist, historian, translator and man of letters
Lizette Etsebeth-Schoeman (born 1963), South African former track and field athlete
Marnus Schoeman (born 1989), South African rugby union footballer
Paul Schoeman, South African rugby union player
Pierre Schoeman (born 1994), South African rugby union player
Renier Schoeman (born 1983), South African rugby union player
Riaan Schoeman (born 1989), South African swimmer who specializes in the Individual Medley and Freestyle events
Roland Schoeman OIS (born 1980), South African swimmer, member of the South African Olympic swimming team four times
Roy H. Schoeman (born 1951), Jewish convert to Catholic Church, author.
Stephanus Schoeman (1810–1890), State President of the South African Republic 1860 to 1862
Tian Schoeman (born 1991) South African rugby union player

See also
Ben Schoeman Freeway, the main freeway between Johannesburg and Pretoria
Jaftha v Schoeman, important case in South African law
Schumann (disambiguation)
Shuman (disambiguation)